Carl Albin Dahl (2 January 1900 – 15 February 1980) was a Swedish association footballer who played as a striker. He competed in the 1920 and 1924 Summer Olympics and finished in fifth and third place, respectively. Together with his elder brother Harry he came from neighbouring town Landskrona to the larger Helsingborg, and represented Helsingborgs IF. The brother did though return to Landskrona BoIS after only one year. Albin continued his career in Helsingborg until the 1932–33 season. He contributed to Helsingborgs IF winning Allsvenskan, the top tier of Swedish football, three times 1929–30, 1930–31 and 1932–33. He later became manager in several clubs around Helsingborg.

References

External links
profile
Profile

1900 births
1980 deaths
Swedish footballers
Association football forwards
Sweden international footballers
Footballers at the 1920 Summer Olympics
Footballers at the 1924 Summer Olympics
Olympic footballers of Sweden
Olympic bronze medalists for Sweden
Olympic medalists in football
Medalists at the 1924 Summer Olympics
Allsvenskan players
Helsingborgs IF players
Landskrona BoIS players
Swedish football managers
Landskrona BoIS managers
Helsingborgs IF managers
People from Landskrona Municipality
Footballers from Skåne County
20th-century Swedish people